Michael Prendeville Watt (31 July 1936 – 29 March 2015) was a New Zealand sports shooter. He competed in the 50 metre rifle, prone event at the 1972 Summer Olympics, finishing in 29th place.

Born in Wellington on 31 July 1936, Watt was educated at Wellesley College and Scots College. Much of his working life was spent with P&O Shipping in office administration. He died on 29 March 2015.

References

1936 births
2015 deaths
New Zealand male sport shooters
Olympic shooters of New Zealand
Shooters at the 1972 Summer Olympics
Sportspeople from Wellington City
People educated at Scots College, Wellington